North Avenue is a major road located in Quezon City within the Diliman area of northeastern Metro Manila, Philippines. It runs east–west through barangays Bagong Pag-asa, Project 6, and Vasra, forming the northern part of the North Triangle area. The street is located in Quezon City's mixed-use and government area, known for its malls, condominiums, hotels, and the upcoming QC CBD. It is also home to the SM City North EDSA, Trinoma, and Ayala Malls Vertis North located on the avenue's junction with Epifanio de los Santos Avenue (EDSA). The entire avenue is designated as National Route 173 (N173) of the Philippine highway network.

Route description
North Avenue is a six-lane road located at the heart of Quezon City's mixed-use and government district. It begins at its junction with EDSA north of West Avenue in Barangay Bagong Pag-asa in central Diliman. It heads east from this junction to cross Mindanao Avenue, where it then forms the boundary of barangays Bagong Pag-asa and Project 6, towards Agham Road. Located on or near this western section of North are North Avenue Station, SM City North EDSA, TriNoma, Ayala Malls Vertis North, Seda Hotel Vertis North, and Vertis North CBD. After crossing the Agham Road, the eastern section of the avenue is dominated by government establishments, including The Philippine Science High School, Bureau of Fire Protection National Headquarters, Office of the Ombudsman, Veterans Memorial Medical Center and Golf Complex, National Food Authority Office, Sugar Regulatory Administration Office, and the Ninoy Aquino Parks & Wildlife Center. The avenue terminates at the junction with Elliptical Road.

History

Previously called as Hilaga Avenue (Tagalog for north), the avenue forms the northern boundary of the formerly proposed  Diliman Quadrangle within the former Diliman Estate also known as Hacienda de Tuason, purchased by the Philippine Commonwealth government in 1939 as the new capital to replace Manila. It was originally planned as the new city's Central Park housing the new national government buildings (the new presidential palace, Capitol Building, and Supreme Court complex) within the  elliptical site now known as the Quezon Memorial Circle. The quadrangle is bordered on the north by North Avenue, on the east by East Avenue, on the south by Timog (South) Avenue, and on the west by West Avenue. Designed by American city planner William E. Parsons and Harry Frost, in collaboration with engineer AD Williams and architects Juan Arellano and Louis Croft, the site was also to contain the  National Exposition grounds opposite the corner of North Avenue and EDSA (now occupied notably by SM City North EDSA). The Diliman Quadrangle had been largely undeveloped for decades due to lack of funding. After several revisions, the government planners moved the city center to Novaliches due to its higher elevation. By 1976, the country's capital had been transferred back to Manila with only the Quezon Memorial built in the former capital site.

References

Streets in Quezon City